Afonso de Castro (10 December 1911 – 21 August 1980) was a Brazilian rower. He competed in the men's coxless pair event at the 1936 Summer Olympics.

References

External links
 

1911 births
1980 deaths
Brazilian male rowers
Olympic rowers of Brazil
Rowers at the 1936 Summer Olympics
People from Campos dos Goytacazes
Sportspeople from Rio de Janeiro (state)